Eucryptogona is a genus of moths in the Eriocottidae family.

Species
 Eucryptogona trichobathra Lower, 1901

Former species
 Eucryptogona secularis Meyrick, 1918

References

Eriocottidae